Faʻasoʻotauloa Pati Taulapapa is a Samoan politician and former Cabinet Minister. He is a member of the Human Rights Protection Party.

Taulapapa lived in Wellington in the late 1960s, where he started a takeaway bar, and later ran a shop, taxis, and rental properties. He returned to Samoa in 1985, became a farmer, and opened a bakery.

He was first elected to the Legislative Assembly of Samoa at the 1991 election as a candidate for the HRPP. At one stage he served as Minister of Lands. He lost his seat in the 2006 election, but regained it in 2016 after the incumbent switched seats. In March 2016 he was appointed Associate Minister of Agriculture and Fisheries.

In January 2021 Taulapapa announced he was retiring from politics at the 2021 election.

References

Living people
Members of the Legislative Assembly of Samoa
Human Rights Protection Party politicians
Year of birth missing (living people)
Government ministers of Samoa
20th-century Samoan politicians
21st-century Samoan politicians